Satori is a Japanese term from Zen-Buddhism.

Satori may also refer to:

Satori (band), a dub/reggae band from Bay area, California
Satori (Flower Travellin' Band album), 1971
Satori (Flower Travellin' Band Canadian album), the Canadian version of the album
Satori (Lee Konitz album), 1974
Satori (I the Mighty album), 2013
Satori (folklore), a monkey-like youkai from Japanese folklore
Satori (Schmidt novel), a 1981 science fiction novel by Dennis Schmidt
Satori (Winslow novel), a 2011 historical novel by Don Winslow

People with the given name
, Japanese chemist

Characters
Satori (One Piece), the One Piece character
Satori Komeiji, the Touhou Project character
Nova Satori, the Robotech character
Satori Deacon, a character in PS238

Japanese unisex given names